The Great Lakes Indian Fish & Wildlife Commission (GLIFWC) is an intertribal, co-management agency committed to the implementation of off-reservation treaty rights on behalf of its eleven-member Ojibwa tribes. Formed in 1984 and exercising authority specifically delegated by its member tribes, GLIFWC's mission is to help ensure significant off-reservation harvests while protecting the resources for generations to come.

Governance
GLIFWC's policy is set by the Board of Commissioners composed of the tribal chairperson from each member tribe or a designee. Two standing committees, the Voigt Intertribal Task Force and the Great Lakes Fisheries Committee, make recommendations on resource management policies to the board. GLIFWC has six divisions including Administration, Biological Services, Enforcement, Intergovernmental Affairs, Planning & Development, and Public Information.

Although GLIFWC's main focus is preserving the natural resources for generations to come, they are also committed to preserving the traditions and language of the Anishinaabe people.

Coverage areas
 1836 Treaty-ceded Territory (7 Stat. 491)—Co-managed with the Chippewa Ottawa Resource Authority
 1837 Treaty-ceded Territory (7 Stat. 536)
 1842 Treaty-ceded Territory (7 Stat. 591)
 1854 Treaty-ceded Territory (10 Stat. 1109)—Co-managed with the 1854 Treaty Authority

Member tribes
 Bad River Band of the Lake Superior Tribe of Chippewa Indians
 Bay Mills Indian Community
 Fond du Lac Band of Lake Superior Chippewa
 Keweenaw Bay Indian Community
 Lac Courte Oreilles Band of Lake Superior Chippewa Indians
 Lac du Flambeau Band of Lake Superior Chippewa
 Lac Vieux Desert Band of Lake Superior Chippewa
 Mille Lacs Band of Ojibwe
 Red Cliff Band of Lake Superior Chippewa
 Sokaogon Chippewa Community
 St. Croix Chippewa Indians of Wisconsin

References

External links
 GLIFWC's website

Native American organizations
Nature conservation organizations based in the United States
Anishinaabe tribal treaty administrants
Great Lakes region (U.S.)
Ojibwe in the United States
Environmental organizations established in 1984
1984 establishments in the United States